Just west of Wennington railway station lies Wennington junction where the Furness and Midland Joint Railway leaves the Leeds to Morecambe section of the Midland Railway. On 11 August 1880 the 12:15 Leeds to Lancaster train completely derailed at the junction points then continued for  before striking the abutment of a bridge.

The junction had no super-elevation as continuous crossing timbers were in use thus reducing the safe speed, and the Midland Railway were advised to correct this. But the enquiry also found the braking power of the train to be grossly inadequate; the train should have been able to stop before reaching the bridge. Only the locomotive was fitted with a Westinghouse brake and there was only one brake van on the train. Although the Midland Railway was fitting continuous brakes to its passenger trains the enquiry pointed out that such a recommendation had been made twenty years previously and the actions had still not been completed.

Sources

External links
Board of Trade report transcription

Railway accidents and incidents in Lancashire
Railway accidents in 1880
1880 in England
Accidents and incidents involving Midland Railway
1880s in Lancashire
Derailments in England
Transport in the City of Lancaster
August 1880 events
1880 disasters in the United Kingdom